Lankascincus deignani, commonly known as Deignan's tree skink and the Deignan tree skink, is a species of lizard in the family Scincidae. The species is endemic to the island of Sri Lanka.

Etymology and taxonomy
L. deignani is named after American ornithologist Herbert Girton Deignan, being originally named Sphenomorphus deignani by Kansas University's Edward H. Taylor, based on a specimen collected by Deignan from Gannoruwa Mountain on November 12, 1944.

Habitat and distribution

Description
L. deignani is a rather large and robust Lanka skink. The midbody scale rows number 28. The lamellae under the fourth toe number 19–20.

The dorsum is olive brown. There is a thick dark lateral stripe, edged above by a brownish yellow stripe, and below by 3–4 gray stripes extending from edge of the orbit to the tail-tip. The venter is cream white or pale pink. There are black spots on the upper jaw.

Ecology and diet
L. deignani is found in moist leaf litter, under stones and logs in forests.

Its diet comprises insects.

Reproduction
L. deignani is oviparous. Typically two eggs are laid per one time.

References

Further reading
Batuwita S, Pethiyagoda R (2007). "Description of a new species of Sri Lankan litter skink (Squamata: Scincidae: Lankascincus)".  Ceylon Journal of Science (Biological Sciences) 36 (2): 80–87. (Lankascincus greeri, new species).
Greer AE (1991). "Lankascincus, a New Genus of Scincid Lizards from Sri Lanka, with Descriptions of Three New Species". Journal of Herpetology 25 (1): 59–64. (Lankascincus deignani, new combination).
Taylor EH (1950). "Ceylonese Lizards of the Family Scincidae". University of Kansas Science Bulletin 33 (13): 481-518. (Sphenomorphus deignani, new species, pp. 497–500, Figure 3).

Lankascincus
Reptiles of Sri Lanka
Endemic fauna of Sri Lanka
Reptiles described in 1950
Taxa named by Edward Harrison Taylor